The 1979–80 Toronto Maple Leafs season was the 63rd season of the franchise, 53rd season as the Maple Leafs. In July 1979, Leafs owner Harold Ballard brought back Punch Imlach, a longtime friend, as general manager. Imlach traded Lanny McDonald to undermine team captain Darryl Sittler's influence on the team. The McDonald trade sent the Leafs into a downward spiral.  They finished five games under .500 and only made the playoffs due to the presence of the Quebec Nordiques, a refugee from the WHA, in the Adams Division.

Offseason

NHL draft

Regular season
The 1979–80 season marked the dismantling of a promising hockey team. The Maple Leafs had stars such as Darryl Sittler, Mike Palmateer, Lanny McDonald, Tiger Williams, Borje Salming and Ian Turnbull. In previous years, the Leafs were always one of the top teams in the league but could not beat the Montreal Canadiens in the playoffs. Leafs' owner Harold Ballard fired General Manager Jim Gregory and Head Coach Roger Neilson. After unsuccessfully attempting to hire both former Boston Bruins head coach Don Cherry (who became head coach of the Colorado Rockies) and former Montreal Canadiens head coach Scotty Bowman (who became head coach and general manager of the Buffalo Sabres), Ballard brought back Punch Imlach, who had been the Leafs' coach and general manager when they last won the Stanley Cup in 1967, to be the team's new GM. Imlach subsequently hired Floyd Smith, a former Leaf player who had previously coached for Imlach when he was GM of the Sabres, to be the Leafs' new head coach.

By November 1979, tensions between Imlach and Sittler mounted as Sittler publicly aired his grievances. An article was featured in the Globe and Mail by James Christie, titled Darryl Sittler drops the Gloves. Sittler was unhappy that Imlach publicly criticized him and Mike Palmateer. Another point of tension for Sittler was the fact that Imlach placed Lanny McDonald and Ian Turnbull on waivers.

On December 13, 1979, Imlach announced that Carl Brewer was making another comeback in the NHL. Brewer would play for the New Brunswick Hawks, the Maple Leafs' American Hockey League affiliate. In Brewer's first game in Moncton, New Brunswick, King Clancy and Johnny Bower showed up to watch him play.

Brewer returned to the Maple Leafs on December 26, 1979, for the Maple Leafs game against the Washington Capitals. Many players on the Leafs felt that Brewer was a spy for Imlach. In Brewer's first game, many of his teammates were openly hostile to him. Brewer's defense partner was Borje Salming, and Salming refused to pass Brewer the puck. During the season, Brewer would only play in twenty contests.

Season standings

Schedule and results

|-
| 1 ||10/10/1979 ||New York Rangers || 3-6 || Maple Leaf Gardens || 0-1-0
|-
| 2 || 10/13/1979||Colorado Rockies ||  2 - 1 || Maple Leaf Gardens || 1-1-0
|-
| 3 ||10/14/1979 || at Philadelphia Flyers ||  3 - 4|| The Spectrum ||  1-2-0
|-
| 4 || 10/17/1979 || Minnesota North Stars || 6 - 2     || Maple Leaf Gardens ||  2-2-0
|-
| 5 || 10/19/1979 || at Washington Capitals || 5 - 3     || Maple Leaf Gardens || 3-2-0
|-
| 6 ||10/20/1979  || Vancouver Canucks || 2 - 0     || Maple Leaf Gardens || 4-2-0
|-
| 7 ||10/24/1979  || at Vancouver Canucks ||1 - 5      || The Pacific Coliseum ||4-3-0
|-
| 8 ||10/26/1979  || at Colorado Rockies || 2 - 2     || McNichols Sports Arena || 4-3-1
|-
| 9 || 10/27/1979 || at Los Angeles Kings || 5 - 7     || The Forum  || 4-4-1
|-
| 10 || 10/31/1979 || Hartford Whalers || 2 - 4     || Maple Leaf Gardens || 4-5-1 
|-

|-
| 11 ||11/2/1979  || at Hartford Whalers ||3 - 5      || Springfield Civic Center || 4-6-1
|-
|12 || 11/3/1979 || Buffalo Sabres || 3 – 4 ||  Maple Leaf Gardens || 4-7-1    
|-
|13 || 11/7/1979 || at St. Louis Blues || 7 - 4 || || 5-7-1   
|-
|14 || 11/10/1979 || at Winnipeg Jets || 8 - 4 || || 6-7-1   
|-
|15|| 11/11/1979 || at Edmonton Oilers || 6 - 3 || || 7-7-1   
|-
|16 || 11/14/1979 || St. Louis Blues || 7 - 2 || || 8-7-1   
|-
|17 || 11/17/1979 || Boston Bruins || 0 - 2 ||Maple Leaf Gardens ||8-8-1
|-
|18 || 11/18/1979 ||at Quebec Nordiques ||2 - 4 ||Le Colisée ||8-9-1   
|-
|19 ||11/21/1979 ||Edmonton Oilers ||4 - 4  ||Maple Leaf Gardens ||8-9-2   
|-
|20 ||11/24/1979 ||Chicago Blackhawks ||1 - 2||Maple Leaf Gardens ||8-10-2    
|-
|21||11/25/1979 ||at New York Rangers ||4 - 3||Madison Square Garden||9-10-2    
|-
|22 ||11/27/1979 ||at Atlanta Flames ||5 - 3|| ||10-10-2   
|-
|23 ||11/28/1979 ||at Washington Capitals ||4 - 2 || ||11-10-2   
|-

|-
| 24 || 12/1/1979|| Philadelphia Flyers|| 4-4 || Maple Leaf Gardens  || 11-10-3
|-
|25 ||12/5/1979 ||Montreal Canadiens ||3 – 2 ||Maple Leaf Gardens ||12-10-3    
|-
|26 ||12/7/1979 ||New York Islanders ||1 - 6    ||Maple Leaf Gardens ||12-11-3
|-
|27 ||12/12/1979 ||Colorado Rockies ||Maple Leaf Gardens ||5 – 3 ||13-11-3    
|-
|28 ||12/15/1979 ||Atlanta Flames ||8 - 1|| Maple Leaf Gardens || 14-11-3    
|-
|29 ||12/17/1979 ||at Minnesota North Stars ||1 - 5    || ||14-12-3
|-
||30 ||12/19/1979 ||Los Angeles Kings ||4 - 4    || Maple Leaf Gardens || 14-12-4
|-
|31 ||12/20/1979 ||at Boston Bruins ||0 – 10 || Boston Garden ||14-13-4    
|-
|32 ||12/22/1979 ||Detroit Red Wings ||2 – 1 ||Maple Leaf Gardens ||15-13-4    
|-
|33 ||12/23/1979 ||at Montreal Canadiens || 4 - 8  ||Montreal Forum ||15-14-4
|-
|34 ||12/26/1979 ||Washington Capitals ||2 - 8    ||Maple Leaf Gardens ||15-15-4
|-
|35 ||12/27/1979 ||at Buffalo Sabres ||3 - 5   ||War Memorial Auditorium ||15-16-4
|-
|36 ||12/29/1979 ||Winnipeg Jets || 6 - 1 ||   Maple Leaf Gardens ||16-16-4
|-

|-
|37 ||1/2/1980 || New York Islanders || 1-3 || Maple Leaf Gardens || 16-17-4
|-
|38 ||1/5/1980 ||Quebec Nordiques ||3 - 7    ||Maple Leaf Gardens ||16-18-4
|-
|39 ||1/7/1980 ||Pittsburgh Penguins ||9 - 5    ||Maple Leaf Gardens ||17-18-4
|-
|40 ||1/9/1980 ||Montreal Canadiens|| 3 - 5 ||Maple Leaf Gardens ||17-19-4   
|-
|41 ||1/12/1980 ||Vancouver Canucks|| 6 - 4 ||Maple Leaf Gardens ||18-19-4   
|-
||42 ||1/16/1980 ||at Pittsburgh Penguins ||4 - 6    || ||18-20-4
|-
||43 ||1/17/1980 ||at New York Islanders ||6 - 9    || ||18-21-4
|-
|44 ||1/19/1980 ||at Montreal Canadiens ||2 - 7  || Montreal Forum ||18-22-4
|-
|45 ||1/22/1980 ||at Atlanta Flames ||4 - 2    || ||19-22-4
|-
|46 ||1/24/1980 ||at Los Angeles Kings ||4 - 5 ||Los Angeles Forum ||19-23-4   
|-
|47 ||1/26/1980 ||at Edmonton Oilers ||3 - 8 ||Northlands Coliseum ||19-24-4   
|-
|48 ||1/27/1980 ||at Vancouver Canucks ||5 - 2    || ||20-24-4
|-
|49 ||1/30/1980 ||Detroit Red Wings ||6 - 4    ||Maple Leaf Gardens ||21-24-4
|-

|-
| 50 ||2/2/1980 || Chicago Blackhawks ||  4-5||Maple Leaf Gardens  || 21-25-4
|-
|51 ||2/3/1980 ||at Chicago Blackhawks ||2 - 4 ||Chicago Stadium ||21-26-4   
|-
|52 ||2/7/1980 ||at Boston Bruins ||6 - 8    ||Boston Garden ||21-27-4
|-
|53 ||2/9/1980 ||Los Angeles Kings ||2 - 7 ||Maple Leaf Gardens ||21-28-4   
|-
|54 ||2/10/1980 ||at Detroit Red Wings ||4 - 1  || ||22-28-4
|-
|55 ||2/13/1980 ||Pittsburgh Penguins ||2 - 4||Maple Leaf Gardens ||22-29-4    
|-
|56 ||2/16/1980 ||Hartford Whalers ||5 - 3   ||Maple Leaf Gardens ||23-29-4
|-
|57 ||2/17/1980 ||at New York Rangers ||6 - 4 ||Madison Square Garden ||24-29-4   
|-
|58 ||2/19/1980 ||at New York Islanders ||6 - 4 || ||25-29-4  
|-
|59 ||2/20/1980 ||at Chicago Blackhawks ||2 - 4 ||Chicago Stadium ||25-30-4   
|-
|60 ||2/23/1980 ||at Winnipeg Jets ||9 - 3 || ||26-30-4  
|-
|61 ||2/26/1980 ||at St. Louis Blues ||2 – 5 || || 26-31-4    
|-
|62 ||2/27/1980 ||at Colorado Rockies ||4 - 3|| ||27-31-4    
|-

|-
| 63|| 3/1/1980 || Philadelphia Flyers || 3 - 3     || Maple Leaf Gardens || 27-31-5
|-
|64 || 3/2/1980 || at Detroit Red Wings || 6 - 3 || || 28-31-5   
|-
|65 || 3/5/1980 || at Pittsburgh Penguins || 5 - 3 || || 29-31-5   
|-
|66 || 3/8/1980 || Quebec Nordiques || 3 - 2 || 30-31-5   
|-
|67 || 3/9/1980 || at Quebec Nordiques || 4 - 5 || Le Colisée || 30-32-5   
|-
|68 || 3/12/1980 || St. Louis Blues || 2 - 3 || Maple Leaf Gardens || 30-33-5   
|-
|69 ||3/15/1980 ||New York Rangers ||4 - 8 ||Maple Leaf Gardens||30-34-5   
|-
|70||3/17/1980 ||Atlanta Flames ||1 - 5 ||Maple Leaf Gardens||30-35-5   
|-
|71 ||3/19/1980 ||Winnipeg Jets ||9 - 1 ||Maple Leaf Gardens ||31-35-5   
|-
|72 ||3/20/1980 ||at Philadelphia Flyers ||3 - 0|| ||32-35-5    
|-
|73 ||3/22/1980 ||Buffalo Sabres ||1 - 5 ||Maple Leaf Gardens ||32-36-5   
|-
|74 ||3/24/1980 ||Washington Capitals ||6 - 1  ||Maple Leaf Gardens ||33-36-5
|-
|75 ||3/25/1980 ||at Minnesota North Stars ||2 - 7 || ||33-37-5  
|-
|76 ||3/29/1980 ||Edmonton Oilers ||5 – 8 ||Maple Leaf Gardens || 33-38-5
|-

|-
|77 ||4/1/1980 ||at Hartford Whalers  ||5-4  ||  || 34-38-5
|-
|78 ||4/2/1980 ||Boston Bruins  ||2-5 ||Maple Leaf Gardens  || 34-39-5
|-
|79 ||4/5/1980 ||Minnesota North Stars  ||2-1 ||Maple Leaf Gardens  || 35-39-5
|-
|80 ||4/6/1980 ||at Buffalo Sabres ||3-7 ||Buffalo War Memorial Auditorium  || 35-40-5
|-

|-
| 1979–80 Schedule

Transactions
 On December 29, 1979: The Maple Leafs traded Lanny McDonald and Joel Quenneville to the Colorado Rockies for Wilf Paiement and Pat Hickey.
 February 18, 1980: Tiger Williams was traded to the Vancouver Canucks for Rick Vaive and Bill Derlago.

Player statistics

Regular season
Scoring

Goaltending

Playoffs
Scoring

Goaltending

Playoffs

Transactions
The Maple Leafs have been involved in the following transactions during the 1979-80 season.

Trades

Waivers

Free agents

Awards and records
Borje Salming, runner-up, Norris Trophy
Borje Salming was voted to the Second Team All-Stars (a rarity in that usually the runner-up for the Norris joins the Norris winner on the First Team All-Stars).

Farm teams
The Maple Leafs were affiliated with the New Brunswick Hawks of the American Hockey League.

References

Notes

Bibliography
The Power of Two: Carl Brewer's Battle with Hockey's Power Brokers, Susan Foster with notes by Carl Brewer, Fenn Publishing Company Ltd., Bolton, Ontario, 2006,  (paperback).
National Hockey League Official Guide and Record Book 2006, Dan Diamond & Associates, Toronto, Ontario, .

External links
 Maple Leafs on Hockey Database

Toronto Maple Leafs seasons
Toronto Maple Leafs season, 1979-80
Toronto
Toronto Maple Leafs
Toronto Maple Leafs